The Battle of Aghdam (June – July 1993) took place on 23 July 1993 during the First Nagorno-Karabakh War, during which Armenian forces captured the Azerbaijani city of Aghdam, which they considered a main staging area of Azerbaijani forces for attacks and artillery strikes against the Armenian-populated Nagorno-Karabakh region. A significant part of the surrounding Aghdam District was captured by Armenian forces as well.

According to Human Rights Watch, Armenian forces used the power vacuum in Azerbaijan at the time, and seized Agdam in July 1993. HRW reported that "during their offensive against Agdam, Karabakh Armenian forces committed several violations of the rules of war, including hostage-taking, indiscriminate fire, and the forcible displacement of civilians". After the city was seized, it was intentionally looted and burned under orders of Karabakh Armenian authorities in retaliation for Azerbaijan's destruction of the Armenian-populated city of Martakert. BBC reported that every single Azeri house in the town was blown up to discourage return.

Background
By mid-1993, Azerbaijani forces had lost control of most of the territory of the former Nagorno-Karabakh Autonomous Oblast which they had captured in Operation Goranboy in 1992. In June 1993, the rebellious Azerbaijani colonel Surat Huseynov marched his troops on Baku, leaving the Karabakh front vulnerable in the ensuing political crisis. Armenian forces took advantage of the crisis and advanced on Aghdam. The city of Aghdam, which had about 50,000 inhabitants prior to its capture, is located about 30 km northeast of Stepanakert and 5 km east of the border of the former Nagorno-Karabakh Autonomous Oblast. Azerbaijanis in Agdam and Armenians in Stepanakert and Askeran would exchange heavy artillery fire. The shelling of Agdam became more intense starting from early March 1993.

Battle
The battle of Agdam started on June 12 from north and south of Agdam using Grad missile launchers, heavy artillery and tanks. The campaign also included simultaneous assault on Tartar. The first attack on the city was repelled by Azerbaijani defense. The clash was marked by the death of Monte Melkonian, a famed Armenian military commander. Armenians were able to capture Farukh mountain 10 km away from Agdam overlooking the town from the northeast. Khydyrly village around which Azerbaijani forces took up positions fell next.

The Armenian advancement was conducted with numerous violations of the rules of war, including the forcible exodus of the civilian population, indiscriminate fire and hostage-taking.

Aftermath
Despite the national mobilization, Azerbaijani forces were able to retake only a few villages but not the city.

Following the battle of Aghdam, on July 25 ceasefire was announced by Armenian authorities and Azerbaijani government. In the course of next three months, Armenians captured four new Azerbaijani districts of Qubadli, Jabrayil, Fizuli and Zangelan resulting in displacement of 350000 of Azerbaijani civilians. 

Several villages such as Chirakhly and the city of Agdam became ghost towns. Other villages of the Agdam Rayon were repopulated by the IDPs from the former NKAO.

See also
United Nations Security Council Resolution 853
Operation Goranboy

References

First Nagorno-Karabakh War
Aghdam
Conflicts in 1993
1993 in Azerbaijan
Aghdam
June 1993 events in Asia
July 1993 events in Asia